Defending champions Nicholas Taylor and David Wagner defeated Johan Andersson and Peter Norfolk in the final, 6–2, 6–3 to win the quad doubles wheelchair tennis title at the 2009 Australian Open.

Main draw

Finals

References

Wheelchair Quad Doubles
2009 Quad Doubles